KAWL (1370 AM) is a radio station serving York, Nebraska. Owned by the Nebraska Rural Radio Association, it broadcasts a classic hits format as Kool 103.5.

The station went on the air September 18, 1954 under the ownership of Mel and Tom Gleason's Prairie States Broadcasting, Inc. This station remained in the Gleason family until its sale in 2004 to Mark Jensen's MWB Broadcasting LLC. Effective April 28, 2015, the station and FM sister KTMX were sold to the Nebraska Rural Radio Association for $1.335 million.

In November 2015, the Nebraska Rural Radio Association purchased K282BE, a silent translator station at 104.3 FM in Hastings, Nebraska, and moved the station to 103.5 FM in York as K278CI. K278CI returned to the air with a classic hits format in March 2016 and KAWL, now an AM-FM combo, rebranded as Kool 103.5.

References

External links

AWL
Radio stations established in 1954